Rutuja Latke is an Indian politician who is serving as Member of 14th Maharashtra Legislative Assembly from Andheri East Assembly constituency. She is the spouse of Ramesh Latke.

References 

Shiv Sena politicians
Maharashtra MLAs 2019–2024
Living people
Year of birth missing (living people)